Jiří Novák and David Rikl were the defending champions but lost in the second round to Tomás Carbonell and Nicolás Lapentti.

Guillermo Cañas and Rainer Schüttler won in the final 4–6, 7–6(7–1), 6–4 against Michael Hill and Jeff Tarango.

Seeds
Champion seeds are indicated in bold text while text in italics indicates the round in which those seeds were eliminated. All eight seeded teams received byes to the second round.

Draw

Final

Top half

Bottom half

External links
 2001 Mercedes Cup Doubles Draw

Doubles 2001
Stuttgart Doubles